The 2011–12 Carolina Hurricanes season was the 40th season for the franchise, 33rd in the National Hockey League (NHL) dating back to June 22, 1979, and 14th season since the franchise relocated to North Carolina to start the 1997–98 NHL season.

The Hurricanes failed to qualify for the Stanley Cup playoffs for the third straight year. The last time the team made the trip to the playoffs was in the 2008–09 season.

Regular season
On November 28, 2011, the Hurricanes replaced head coach Paul Maurice with Kirk Muller.

Playoffs
The Hurricanes failed to qualify for the 2012 Stanley Cup playoffs.

Standings

Schedule and results

Pre-season

Regular season

Player statistics

Skaters

Goaltenders
Note: GP = Games played; Min = Minutes played; W = Wins; L = Losses; OT = Overtime losses; GA = Goals against; GAA= Goals against average; SA= Shots against; SV= Saves; Sv% = Save percentage; SO= Shutouts

†Denotes player spent time with another team before joining Hurricanes. Stats reflect time with Hurricanes only.
‡Traded mid-season
Bold/italics denotes franchise record

Awards and records

Awards

Records

Milestones

Transactions 

The Hurricanes have been involved in the following transactions during the 2011–12 season.

Trades 

|}

Free agents acquired

Free agents lost

Claimed via waivers

Lost via waivers

Lost via retirement

Player signings

Draft picks 
The 2011 NHL Entry Draft was held in St. Paul, Minnesota.

References

Carolina Hurricanes seasons
C
C
Hurr
Hurr